Irresistible Forces is an album by Jack DeJohnette's Special Edition, with Greg Osby, Gary Thomas, Mick Goodrick, Lonnie Plaxico and Naná Vasconcelos. It was recorded in 1987 and released on the MCA label.

AllMusic's Scott Yanow wrote that "the somewhat unique music gives all of the musicians opportunities to express themselves and inspire each other."

Track listing 
All compositions by Jack DeJohnette except as indicated
 "Introduction" - 0:41
 "Irresistible Forces" - 7:48
 "Preludio Pra Nana" - 4:02
 "Herbie's Hand Cocked" - 5:19
 "Osthetics" (Greg Osby) - 7:32
 "47th Groove" - 5:43
 "Silver Hollow" - 6:56
 "Interlude/Ponta De Areia" (Milton Nascimento) - 1:21
 "Milton" - 7:56
 "3rd World Anthem" - 13:02
 "Conclusion" - 1:03
Recorded in January 1987

Personnel 
 Jack DeJohnette – drums, piano, drum machine, electronic keyboards
 Gary Thomas – tenor saxophone, flute, clarinet
 Greg Osby – alto saxophone, soprano saxophone
 Lonnie Plaxico – electric bass, double bass
 Mick Goodrick – electric guitar
 Naná Vasconcelos – percussion, vocals

References 

Jack DeJohnette albums
1987 albums
MCA Records albums
Impulse! Records albums